Andrew Stewart MBE (30 December 1933 – 11 October 1993) was a Scottish singer and entertainer. He presented the BBC TV variety show The White Heather Club throughout the 1960s, and his song "Donald Where's Your Troosers?" was a hit in both 1960 and 1989. Internationally, the song most closely associated with Stewart is "A Scottish Soldier".

Early life and education
Stewart was born in Glasgow, Scotland in 1933, the son of a teacher. When he was five years old, the family moved to Perth and then, six years later, to Arbroath. Even in early childhood, he loved imitating people and amazed his parents with impersonations of famous singers and actors. He attended Arbroath High School, where his father taught science.

In 1950, at the age of 16, he participated in the Arbroath Abbey Pageant, taking the part of "A Knight in Shining Armour". Up until this time, he had not thought seriously about a career in entertainment, as he had aspirations of becoming a veterinary surgeon. He then decided to train as an actor at the Royal Scottish Academy of Music and Drama in Glasgow, where he studied until 1954. During his first year at the college, he obtained First Prize for Comedy; he also excelled in fencing, particularly at the foil.

Career
Stewart's patriotic wearing of tartan and his use of stereotypical Scottish humour throughout the 1960s, echoed the music hall style and songs of fellow Scot Sir Harry Lauder.

Stewart himself attributed his "breakthrough" onto the international stage to the success of his "A Scottish Soldier" recording, which became a no. 1 hit in Canada, Australia and New Zealand, spent 40 weeks in the UK Singles Chart (1961), reached no. 69 on the US Billboard Hot 100 and also achieved hit status in South Africa and India.  His other international hit singles included "Come in-Come in", "Donald Where's Your Troosers?", "Campbeltown Loch", "The Muckin' O' Geordie's Byre", "The Road to Dundee", "The Battle's O'er" (No. 1 on the Australian charts in July 1961), "Take Me Back", "Tunes of Glory", and "Dr. Finlay" (1965). He is also remembered for being the compere of The White Heather Club. This was a BBC Scotland television programme that existed as an annual New Year's Eve party (1957–1968), and also as a weekly early-evening series (1960–1968). At the height of its popularity, the show had a viewership of 10 million.

"Donald Where's Your Troosers?" was a hit in late 1960 and again when reissued in 1989. Stewart is said to have written the song in 10 minutes as he sat, minus trousers, in the lavatory of a recording studio. Stewart included an Elvis Presley impersonation halfway through the song. On the strength of this comedy hit, Stewart toured Australia and appeared on The Ed Sullivan Show in 1968, doing impersonations of Dean Martin. His skill with different accents is also evident on "The Rumour", where the rumour moves across Scotland and into Ireland, with Stewart speaking in a different accent for each place. Stewart's stage shows often included his impersonations of other famous singers, including Tom Jones, Billy Eckstine, Louis Armstrong, Dean Martin, Johnnie Ray, Elvis Presley, Petula Clark and Johnny Cash.

His albums, such as Scottish Soldier, The Best of Andy Stewart and Andy Stewart's Scotland, were also popular internationally. In 1973 he recorded a "live" album in Johannesburg, South Africa, entitled Andy Stewart in South Africa – White Heather Concert, which also featured accordionist Jimmy Blue, singers Alexander Morrison and Anna Desti and pianist Mark Simpson.

His international appeal was well-illustrated by his appearance at the 1964 New York World's Fair, attended by many thousands of people. From the early 1960s to the mid-1980s, he frequently and successfully toured Canada, the US, Australia and New Zealand. He appeared in concert throughout South Africa in 1968, 1971 and 1973. He also performed in Rhodesia (now Zimbabwe) as well as in Singapore and Hong Kong. Coming out of retirement in 1991, he began tours at home and abroad once again.

A prolific lyricist, he penned words to many traditional Scottish tunes, e.g. "Green Hills of Tyrol" (which he called "A Scottish Soldier"), "The Black Bear" ("Tunes of Glory"), and "The Battle is Over" ("The Battle's O'er"). He wrote his first lyric at the age of 14 (to a tune composed by his father) and called the song "My Hameland", which in 1969 (21 years later) became the title track of one of his albums.

Stewart took part in the 1961, 1962 and 1978 Royal Variety Performances and also appeared for the Royal Family at a Christmas party at Windsor Castle.

Scotch Corner, a Scottish television series (1972–1976) featured Andy Stewart and various guest singers and musicians. Some of the artists included in these broadcasts accompanied Stewart on his international White Heather concert tours during the 1970s. Andy's Party was another popular TV series on Grampian Television in the late 1970s.

He was the subject of This Is Your Life in 1975 when he was surprised by Eamonn Andrews.

From 1973 onward, recurrent ill-health took its toll on his voice and stage vitality. Frequently hospitalised in the 1970s and 1980s, he underwent several heart and stomach operations, including triple heart bypass surgery in 1976 and again in 1991.

Retirement and death
In retirement, he moved back to Arbroath. "Donald Where's Your Troosers" was a surprise hit when reissued in late 1989. Marketed as a novelty song ideal for Christmas parties, it was actively promoted by BBC Radio One DJ Simon Mayo and reached number 4 on the UK Singles Chart. In response, Stewart provided a jingle for Mayo, "Simon, where's your troosers?".

Coming out of retirement in 1991, he began touring once again and recorded two CDs on the Scotdisc label. In 1993 a summer season at the Capitol Moat House Hotel in Edinburgh was cut short because of a back injury. A further long season for the following year was planned at the same venue. Shortly before he died in 1993, he gave a small concert at Arbroath High School for the pupils. He was also due to appear in The "Pride of the Clyde" at Glasgow's Pavilion Theatre and other tours and concerts were planned. A sheltered housing scheme in Arbroath, 'Andy Stewart Court', was named in his memory.

Stewart died the day after a performance at a Gala Benefit Concert for Children's Hospice Association Scotland (CHAS) at Usher Hall in Edinburgh. Stewart suffered a fatal heart attack at his home. Stewart's funeral took place at St Andrew's Church (Church of Scotland) in Arbroath on Friday 15 October. His family were joined by many stars and friends from the entertainment world. A large crowd gathered outside the church to pay their respects to "The Tartan Trooper", while a piper played "A Scottish Soldier" and "The Battle's O'er".

Awards and family
Stewart was awarded an MBE in 1976. He received the Freedom of Angus in 1987.

His son Ewan Stewart is an actor, whose film and television credits include Rob Roy, Titanic, Valhalla Rising, Only Fools and Horses and River City.

Stewart's grandson Harris Beattie played the title role of Billy Elliot in the eponymous West End production. In 2017 Harris won the prestigious Royal Academy of Dance Gold medal at the Genée International Ballet Competition and currently is a dancer with Northern Ballet based in Leeds. Another grandson, Alistair Beattie, toured internationally as a dancer in Matthew Bourne's, Swan Lake (2018-2020).

Discography

Albums
A Scottish Soldier (1961) (EMI)
Andy Stewart (1961) (EMI)
Andy Sings Songs of Scotland (1963) (EMI)
Andy the Rhymer Comedy Verse (1963) (EMI)
Tunes of Glory (date unknown) (EMI)
I'm Off To Bonnie Scotland (1966)) (EMI)
Campbeltown Loch (1965) (EMI)
The Best of Andy Stewart (1967) (EMI)
Andy Stewart and his Friends of The White Heather Club (1967) (EMI)
Andy Stewart on Stage Live from Canada (August 1967) (EMI)
I Love To Wear The Kilt (1969) (EMI)
Andy Stewart Sings Harry Lauder (1969) (EMI)
My Hameland (1970) (EMI Music for Pleasure)
Here's Tae You! (1971) (EMI)
Andy Stewart Invites You to Scotch Corner (based on the television series) (1973) (EMI)
Andy Stewart in South Africa – White Heather Concert (1973) (EMI)
The Very Best of Andy Stewart (compilation) (1975) (EMI)
Brand New From Andy (with Jimmy Blue and his Band) (1975) (PYE)
Country Boy (with Anne Williamson)(1976)
Andy's Hogmanay Party Live Album (1977) (PYE)
Andy Stewart's Greatest Hits (with Jimmy Blue and his Band) (1977) (PYE)
Scotland is Andy Stewart (1978) (EMERALD)
Sing A Song of Scotland Double Album (1979) (Warwick Records)
For Auld Lang Syne (1980) (EMERALD)
Come In, Come In (1983) (LISMOR)
Back to the Bothy (1987) (LISMOR)
Andy Stewart's Scotland (1992) (Scotdisc)
Andy's Party Live Album Recorded in the Beach Ballroom, Aberdeen (1993) (Scotdisc)
20 Scottish Favourites (compilation) (1993/re-issue: 2001) (EMI)
Andy Stewart, Forever In Song (Compilation)
My Homeland (70's and 80's compilation)
Andy Stewart Scottish Songs (2010) (Compilation of early material) (Pickwick Group Ltd)
The Scottish Soldier (2012) ( Compilation of less well known early material) (Pickwick Group Ltd)

Singles
"A Scottish Soldier" (1960 UK; 1961 US; No.1 CAN)
"Donald Where's Your Troosers?" (1961) (EMI Top Rank) (No.1 CAN)
"Campbeltown Loch"
"The Muckin' O' Geordie's Byre"
"The Road to Dundee"
"The Battle's O'er"
"I've Never Kissed A Bonnie Lass Before"
"Soldier Boy (The Sunset Call)"
"Barren Rocks of Aden"
"Take Me Back"
"Tunes of Glory"
"Dr. Finlay" (1965)
"The Gallant Forty-Twa" (1968)
"Rainbows Are Back in Style" (1969)
"Farewell My Love" (1972)
"Song of Freedom" (1975)
"The Green Crystal Bag" (1976)
"Mcginty's Meal and Ale" (1986)
"The Muckin' O' Geordie's Byre" (re-issue, 1986)
"Donald Where's Your Troosers?" (re-issue, 1989)
"Donald Where's Your Troosers?" (re-re-issue, 2018)

Four track EPs
Andy Sings (1960)
Andy Sings (1961)
Andy's Hits
Heather Bells (1965)

DVDs
Andy Stewart's Scotland (1992)
Andy's Party (1993)
Andy Stewart and the Scots Dragoon Guards

See also
Music of Scotland
Royal Variety Performance
List of British Music Hall musicians
List of artists who reached number one on the Australian singles chart
List of number-one singles in Australia during the 1960s
List of Scottish musicians

References

External links
 
 

1933 births
1993 deaths
Musicians from Glasgow
Alumni of the Royal Conservatoire of Scotland
Scottish entertainers
20th-century Scottish male singers
People from Arbroath
British comedy musicians
British novelty song performers
Members of the Order of the British Empire
20th-century British comedians